Pachadlela (English: The Possessed One) is a 2004 Marathi horror-comedy directed by Mahesh Kothare and stars Bharat Jadhav, Shreyas Talpade, Laxmikant Berde, Vandana Gupte, Dilip Prabhawalkar in lead role. Visual effects by Binoy Samuel.  The movie revolves around three friends working in a bank who get posted to a  village. They are put up in a Wada (Palace) by the bank. But according to the villagers, the spirits of the previous owner, his son and his trusted aide still haunt the house. The movie was released on 7 May 2004 and was praised by the Marathi audience for story and performance.

Plot
Bharat, Ravi and Sameer are transferred to village branch of their bank and are granted an old wada (palace) as a living quarters. They immediately start experiencing paranormal activities which mainly affect Bharat. Initially, Ravi and Sameer deny to believe Bharat when he tells them about the Wada being haunted. Kirkire possesses Bharat on Ravi's engagement day and reveals certain ritualistic problems which cause Ravi's engagement ceremony to be a total disaster. Bharat is admitted to a mental asylum. Soon Bharat and his friends learn about the story behind the spirits at the Wada from Inspector Mahesh Jadhav. In the past Inamdar Bhusnale was a rich, arrogant and deceptive owner of the Wada. His son Babya was mentally unstable and had a maniacal obsession for marriage. As per a suggestion from a renowned priest, Bhusnale fixes Babya's wedding with a girl from outside the village so that she won't be aware of Babya's real illness. As per the priest's prediction, as soon as Babya would get married he will be miraculously cured. But, Durga Maushi who is Bhusnale's neighbor and an outspoken critique of his family learns about this plan and disrupts the wedding ritual. The girl and her family learn about the truth and call off the marriage. This causes immense loss of reputation to Bhusnale. Also due to the shock caused by the situation Babya breaks down mentally and is admitted to a mental asylum where he commits suicide. Bhusnale vows to take revenge and dies due to a heart attack. Ever since that day Babya, 
his father Bhusnale and their custodian Kirkire haunt the palace seeking a medium for avenging Durga Maushi's actions. Bharat, Sameer and Ravi work together along with their friends and Vetale Guruji to perform a ritual to destroy the evil spirits of Bhusnale, Babya and Kirkire. As per a book by Vetale's great-grandfather who was a master ghost hunter, Vetale places three dolls each accompanied by an object of interest of Bhusnale, Babya and Kirkire. Their spirits then enter the dolls and the dolls are burnt in the ritual fire. Durga Maushi's spirit gets peace after learning about this and departs.

Cast
 Bharat Jadhav as Bharat
 Abhiram Bhadkamkar as Sameer
 Shreyas Talpade as Ravi
 Dilip Prabhawalkar as Inamdar Bhusnale, Father of Baban AKA Baabya
 Ameya Hunaswadkar as Baban Inamdar AKA Baabya, Son of Inamdar Bhusnale
 Vijay Chavan as Kirkire, Inamdar Bhusnale's Trusted Aide
 Vandana Gupte as Durga Maushi, Manisha's Mother
 Ashwini Kulkarni as Manisha, Durga Maushi's Daughter & Ravi's Love interest
 Laxmikant Berde as Vetale Guruji, Renowned Priest
 Neelam Shirke as Sunaina, Vetale Guruji's Sister & Sameer's Love interest
 Megha Ghadge as Soundarya Jawalkar, Folk Dance Artist & Bharat's Love interest
 Ravindra Berde as Dhondiba Jawalkar, Soundarya's Father
 Mahesh Kokate as Batashya, Pansy Character
 Neena Kulkarni as Ravi's Mother
 Pradip Kabare as Ravi's Father
 Mangal Kenkare as Manisha's Aunty
 Sajid Sheikh as Zunzarrao Hambirrao Sarnobat Patil Anjangavkar, Bank Manager
 Poornima Ahire as Miss Sawant, Zunzarrao's Secretary
 Vijay Gokhale as Psychiatrist, in Babanrao Psychiatric Hospital
 Mahesh Kothare as Inspector Mahesh Jadhav

Trivia

The Wada (Palace) featured in this film is the Bavdekar Bungalow aka Bavdekar Wada which was and is owned by then Jahagirdar of Gaganbawada Shri Madhavrao Pandit Pant Amatya Bavdekar and his heirs, its located in Gaganbawada a town situated in the district of Kolhapur in Maharashtra, India.

References

External links 
 

2004 comedy horror films
2000s Marathi-language films
Indian comedy horror films
2004 films
Films directed by Mahesh Kothare
2004 comedy films